The band Inspector (from Monterrey, Nuevo Leon) fuses classic Jamaican rhythms with the feel of Mexican pop.

Their style is a blend of ska, reggae, nostalgia for the 1960s rock-n-roll and the great romantic groups of the 1970s, in addition a romantic style of their own. They are part of the musical movement called the Avanzada Regia.

History 
Inspector was born in November 1995 with a group of kids who were looking for fun, to create good music and enjoy themselves. 
After achieving their initial goals as a band, they recorded an independent album called Blanco y Negro (1993) that made them known in the music scene of their hometown of Monterrey and other cities such as Guadalajara, San Luis Potosí, Leon, Querétaro and Mexico City. 
During this time the group's lineup began to take shape. 
Soon they began to be recognized in the ska scene in Mexico thanks to their songs and their unique style, which is essentially reggae and ska, but also crosses through genres such as jazz and rockabilly with rhythmic touches and romantic lyrics with which the public identified immediately. In 1998, they won the prize "Nuestro Rock" for best new group which caused them to perform in more cities.

After a long road and hundreds of concerts throughout Mexico, in 2001 they were signed by the record company Universal Music Mexico and released their album Alma en fuego, an album that would go platinum due to its high sales and which resulted in their first single "Amnesia", which they performed in collaboration with Roco (vocalist from the group Maldita Vecindad) and Ruben Albarran (vocalist for Café Tacuba).
This first single was followed by the singles "Amargo Adiós", "Cara de chango", "Sin rencor" and the footballing theme "Aguante". Alma en Fuego was nominated for a Lo Nuestro Award for Rock/Alternative Album of the Year while the band was listed for Rock New Artist at the 16th Lo Nuestro Awards, losing both to Chilean band La Ley and Mexican singer Alessandra Rosaldo, respectively.

In 2008, they released their third album, Unidad, Cerveza y Ska, an album where the idea was to give continuity between ska and the Mexican-ness and style of the band. From this production the following singles were released: "Ska Voovee Boobie Baby", "Cómo te extraño" and "Por última vez"

In 2009, their fourth album, Amar o morir, was released, where Inspector tried to re-discover their own style and express it in a fresh and interesting way by "travelling" through rhythms that range from punk to soul, or blues to funk through Ska.

Their first single from this album is "El Dejado".

Inspector returned in 2009 with their fifth production called "INSPECTOR", now produced independently with 13 tracks, among which are the covers: "Besame Mucho" and the Madness classic "Our House", also included in this material is a duet of the track "November" with the Mexican singer Ely Guerra.

Members 
Big Javy: Vocals
Padrino: Tenor Sax
Homero: Keyboards
Fabian: Guitar
Gil Treviño: Trumpet
 Luis "Grillo Drummond": Trombone
 Alexis Manjarrez: Alto saxophone
Jose Honorio: Bass

Demos 
 Mision Ska (Demo) (1996)
 Ska Live! (Demo) (1997)

Studio discography 
 Blanco y negro (1998)
 Alma en fuego (2001)
 Unidad, Cerveza y Ska (2004)
 Amar O Morir (2006)
 Inspector (2009)
 Ska A La Carta Vol 1 (2011)
 Inspección Retroacústica (2014)
 Páginas en Blanco (2018)

Music videos
 Amnesia
 Amargo Adiós
 Cara de Chango
 Ska Voovee Boobie Baby
 El dejado
 Cómo te extraño

References

External links 
 Group's official Myspace

Musical groups from Monterrey

Mexican rock music groups
Mexican ska groups